Patrick Ciorcilă (born 20 September 1996) is a Romanian tennis player mainly playing challengers and futures. In April 2014 he played in an ATP 250 tournament but lost in the first round. His coach is Bogdan Nițescu.

References

External links

1996 births
Living people
Sportspeople from Cluj-Napoca
Romanian male tennis players
21st-century Romanian people